Akaimia is an extinct genus of carpet sharks which existed across Europe. Two species are known, the type species A. altucuspis from the middle or late Jurassic (Callovian or Oxfordian age) of Ogrodzieniec near Zawiercie, southern Poland, and  A. myriacuspis, from the middle Jurassic (Callovian) of the Oxford Clay, near Peterborough. It was first named by Jan Rees in 2010.

References

Fossil taxa described in 2010
Jurassic sharks
Jurassic fish of Europe